Chicomoztoc is the name for the mythical origin place of the Aztec Mexicas, Tepanecs, Acolhuas, and other Nahuatl-speaking peoples (or Nahuas) of the central Mexico region of Mesoamerica, in the Postclassic period.

The term Chicomoztoc derives from Nahuatl chicome (“seven”), oztotl (“cave”), and -c (“place”). In symbolic terms these caves within a hill have been compared to the wombs from which the various peoples were born; another possible association is with the seven orifices of the human body. In either case, this term is associated with the origin, birth, or beginning of a group of people, both mythic and historical.

There is an association of Chicomoztoc with certain legendary traditions concerning Culhuacan (Colhuacan), an actual pre-Columbian settlement in the Valley of Mexico which was considered to have been one of the earliest and most pre-eminent settlements in the valley. Culhuacan ("place of those with ancestors" is its literal meaning in Classical Nahuatl) was viewed as a prestigious and revered place by the Aztec/Mexica (who also styled themselves 'Culhua-Mexica'). In Aztec codical writing, the symbol or glyph representing the toponym of Culhuacan took the form of a 'bent' or 'curved' hill (a play on the homonym col- in Nahuatl, meaning "bent, twisted", e.g. as if by old age).

Some researchers have attempted to identify Chicomoztoc with a specific geographic location, likely between 60 and 180 miles northeast of the Valley of Mexico including perhaps a height near the present-day town of San Isidro Culhuacan. The purported existence of actual caves plays a role in New Age Mayanism.

Cerro Culiacán 
In the State of Guanajuato the highest mountain is "El Cerro de Culiacán" and is surrounded by all the signs that correspond to the measure and chronicles of the legendary Chicomoztoc.

In fiction

In Clive Cussler's novel Lost Empire, Chicomoztoc is discovered to be an island in South Sulawesi, Indonesia, from where the ancestors of the Aztec were exiled sometime in the 6th century.

See also
Shamanism

References

External links

Locations in Aztec mythology
Locations in Mesoamerican mythology